Theresienstraße is an U-Bahn station in Maxvorstadt, Munich on the U2.

References

Munich U-Bahn stations
Railway stations in Germany opened in 1980
1980 establishments in West Germany